Eduardo Oscar Camaño (born 17 June 1946) is an Argentine Justicialist Party politician. He was in charge of the executive branch in a caretaker capacity, effectively acting as president, for two days between 31 December 2001, and 1 January 2002.

Political career
Camaño was Mayor of Quilmes Partido from 1987 to 1991. Until 2007 he sat in the Argentine Chamber of Deputies as a deputy elected in Buenos Aires Province. He served as majority leader of the lower house of the Argentine Congress from 2001, hence bringing him to the position of acting president. He became head of the executive branch because of the resignations of interim President Adolfo Rodríguez Saá and provisional Senate president Ramón Puerta.

In recent years he sat in the Federal Peronist block allied to Eduardo Duhalde, largely in opposition to then President Néstor Kirchner. In 2007, Camaño stood again for deputy, this time heading a list of anti-Kirchner Peronists in support of the presidential bid of dissident Peronist Roberto Lavagna. The list did badly and he faced a recount for the final place in the Chamber for the Province with Ricardo Cuccovillo of the Civic Coalition. Ultimately Cuccovillo was sworn in as deputy and Camaño lost his seat.

Camaño chaired the national council of the Justicialist Party, making him de facto party leader, alongside supporters of both Duhalde and Kirchner. In 2008, when Kirchner assumed the leadership of the Justicialist Party, Camaño was offered an executive position, the only ally of Lavagna to do so, in what had been seen as a chance to reconcile the different wings of Peronism.

References

External links
Casa Rosada 

|-

|-

1946 births
People from Quilmes
Politicians from Buenos Aires
Presidents of the Argentine Chamber of Deputies
Members of the Argentine Chamber of Deputies elected in Buenos Aires Province
20th-century Argentine lawyers
Living people
Justicialist Party politicians
Mayors of Quilmes
Acting presidents of Argentina